Paola is a female given name.

Paola may also refer to:

People
Queen Paola of Belgium (born 1937)

Places
Paola, Calabria, Italy
Paola railway station
Paola, Malta
Paola, Kansas, U.S.

See also

Paolo (disambiguation)
Payola (disambiguation)
Paula (disambiguation)